The crocodile catfish (Bagarius suchus) is a species of sisorid catfish native to Laos, Cambodia and Thailand, where it occurs in the Mekong and Chao Phraya river basins. This species reaches a maximum length of  SL.

Ecology 
This species lives in cool, fast-flowing water with a pH range of 6.0 to 7.2 and a temperature range of 18.0-23.0 °C (64.4-73.4 °F).

References 

Sisoridae
Catfish of Asia
Fish of the Mekong Basin
Fish of Laos
Fish of Thailand
Fish described in 1893